Mocking Shadows is a Canadian R&B and jazz/funk fusion band from Calgary, Alberta.

History
Mocking Shadows was founded in 1997, and originally performed traditional rhythm and blues music. 
The band's first album was entitled Mock1, and this was followed in 1999 with a live album, Caught in the Act, and "Long Way," in 2001. In 2001 and 2002, the Mocking Shadows toured across Canada with B. B King.

The band released several more albums; their album Out of the Blue was nominated for a Western Canadian Music Award in 2004. The Shadows horn section also contributed to Boogie Patrol's 2017 album Man On Fire.

Band members

2018 lineup
Jory Kinjo, Bass/Vocals.  
Gareth Hughes, Saxophone/Vocals. 
Steve Fletcher, Keys/Vocals.  
Fred Brenton/Jon May, Drums.
Arun Bhaumik/Aaron White, Guitar.  
Kim Beachum, Trumpet/Flugelhorn.
Carsten Rubeling, Trombone
Amber Suchy, Vocals
Stephanie Suchy, Vocals

Past members
Fernando Longhi, Drums.  
Rob Phillips, Guitar/Vocals.  
Mike Little, Keys/B3. 
Darren Bourne, Keys/B3
Andrew Lattoni, Trombone.  
Roderick Tate, Trombone.  
Ian Hartley, Trumpet/Backing Vocals
John Johnston(deceased)Bass. 
Patrick Raymaker, Keyboards.
Dan Smith, Guitar

Discography
Mock - 1 - 1998
Long Way - 2001
Caught in the Act - 1999
Out of the Blue - 2003
Check One - 2005
The Sound - 2007

References

External links

Mocking Shadows at myspace

Musical groups established in 1997
Musical groups from Calgary
Canadian jazz ensembles
1997 establishments in Alberta